The Kosciuszko Street station is a local station on the BMT Jamaica Line of the New York City Subway. It is served by the J train at all times. The Z train skips this station when it operates.

Station layout

This elevated station has two side platforms and three tracks; the center express track is not used in regular service.

The artwork here is called Euphorbias by Ronald Calloway and has a floral theme.

Exits
The station has exits on both the west (railroad north) end and the east (railroad south) end of its platforms.

On the east end, each platform has a single staircase leading to an elevated station house beneath the tracks. It has a turnstile bank and token booth. Outside fare control, two staircases lead to both western corners of Kossuth Place, Patchen Avenue, Lafayette Avenue, and Broadway, just east of Kosciuszko Street.

The western exits are now emergency exits leading to both eastern corners of DeKalb Avenue and Broadway. These exits were closed in the 1980s due to high crime. The closed entrance is about a block from the northern terminus of the B46 Select Bus Service at DeKalb Avenue. There is a closed station house around the intermediate level of the staircases.

References

External links 
 
 
 Station Reporter — J train
 The Subway Nut — Kosciuszko Street Pictures
 MTA's Arts For Transit — Kosciuszko Street (BMT Jamaica Line)
 Kosciuszko Street entrance from Google Maps Street View
 Platforms from Google Maps Street View

BMT Jamaica Line stations
1888 establishments in New York (state)
New York City Subway stations in Brooklyn
Railway stations in the United States opened in 1888
Bushwick, Brooklyn
Bedford–Stuyvesant, Brooklyn